Moussa Sidibé (born 22 August 1981 in Paris) is a French former professional footballer who played as a left-back or left midfielder. He is the cousin of Mamady Sidibé. Originally, Sidibé was a striker like his brother.

Sidibé previously played for Creteil, Vannes and Nîmes in Ligue 2.

References

External links
 

1981 births
Living people
French footballers
French people of Malian descent
Footballers from Paris
Association football forwards
US Créteil-Lusitanos players
Ebbsfleet United F.C. players
Gazélec Ajaccio players
Clermont Foot players
Vannes OC players
Nîmes Olympique players
AS Beauvais Oise players
US Roye-Noyon players
Ligue 2 players
Championnat National players
Championnat National 2 players
Championnat National 3 players
French expatriate footballers
French expatriate sportspeople in England
Expatriate footballers  in England